The Whipple–Cullen House and Barn is an historic farmstead on Old River Road in Lincoln, Rhode Island.  The main house is a -story wood-frame structure, five bays wide, with a large central chimney and a gable roof.  An addition extends to the rear, and a 19th-century porch is on the side of the house.  The barn, dating to the late 19th century, is north of the house, and there is a former farm shed, now converted to a garage, to its south.  The property is located across the street from the Lincoln town offices.  The house, built c. 1740, is one of the town's least-altered 18th century houses, and the barn is a rare survivor of the town's agrarian past.

The property was listed on the National Register of Historic Places in 1991.

See also
National Register of Historic Places listings in Providence County, Rhode Island

References

Houses on the National Register of Historic Places in Rhode Island
Houses completed in 1740
Houses in Lincoln, Rhode Island
Barns in Rhode Island
National Register of Historic Places in Providence County, Rhode Island
1740 establishments in Rhode Island